The A4103 is an A-road which runs from Worcester to the A480 in Stretton Sugwas, a village  west of Hereford. The road is a primary route as far as the junction with the A465 east of Hereford, and is liable to flooding at Bransford, where it crosses the River Teme.

References

External links 
 Travel news from BBC Hereford and Worcester

Roads in England
Transport in Gloucestershire
Transport in Herefordshire
Roads in Worcestershire
Transport in Worcester, England